The 2016 KPL Top 8 Cup was the fifth edition of the tournament, which kicked off on 1 May and ended on 16 October. It was contested by the top 8 teams of the 2015 season of the Kenyan Premier League: A.F.C. Leopards, Bandari, Gor Mahia, Muhoroni Youth, Sofapaka, Tusker, Ulinzi Stars and Ushuru.

Gor Mahia were the defending champions of the competition, having won their second title in the previous season after beating Sony Sugar 2–1 after extra time in the final played at the Moi Stadium in Kisumu. However, they were beaten in the final by winners Muhoroni Youth, who picked up their first title of the competition and KSh.  in prize money.

Format
The tournament follows a single-elimination format for the quarter-finals and the final, where the winning team immediately advances to the next round or wins the tournament, respectively.

For the semi-finals, the tournament adopts a double-elimination format, where a team must win two legs to advance to the final. If both teams are equal on aggregate goals at the end of the two legs, a penalty shoot-out will be conducted to determine who advances to the final. The away goals rule also applies in this round.

2015 Kenyan Premier League standings

Bracket

Quarter-finals
The draw for the quarter-finals was held on 12 April.

Fixtures
The ties are scheduled to take place on 1–2 May.

Semi-finals
The draw for the semi-finals was held on 2 May at the Nyayo National Stadium.

First leg
The first leg matches took place on 12 June.

Second leg
The second leg matches will take place on 19 June.

1–1. Muhoroni Youth advance to the final on away goals rule.

Gor Mahia win 3–0 on aggregate.

Final
The final took place on 16 October.

Goalscorers
2 goals

  Mark Makwata (Ulinzi Stars)
  Humphrey Mieno (Tusker)
  Clifton Miheso (A.F.C. Leopards)
  Jacques Tuyisenge (Gor Mahia)

1 goal

  Enock Agwanda (Gor Mahia)
  Moses Arita (Muhoroni Youth)
  Abdallah Hamisi (Muhoroni Youth)
  Francis Kahata (Gor Mahia)
  Edwin Lavatsa (Bandari)
  Churchill Muloma (Ulinzi Stars)
  Enosh Ochieng (Ulinzi Stars)
  Wellington Ochieng (Muhoroni Youth)
  Wycliffe Ochomo (Muhoroni Youth)
  Kennedy Rono (Muhoroni Youth)

Team statistics

|-
|colspan="20"|Eliminated in the semi-finals
|-

|-
|colspan="20"|Eliminated in the quarter-finals
|-

Notes

References

KPL Top 8 Cup seasons
Top 8 Cup